Kaba Sone Hti (lit. Till the End of the World) is a 2005 Burmese musical drama film directed by Khin Maung Oo and Soe Thein Htut starring Htun Htun and Eaindra Kyaw Zin and Wyne Su Khine Thein.

Cast
Htun Htun
Eaindra Kyaw Zin
Wyne Su Khine Thein

References

2005 films
Burmese drama films
2000s musical drama films
2005 drama films